Island of the Mad is a 2018 mystery novel by American author Laurie R. King. Fifteenth in the Mary Russell series, the story features married detectives Mary Russell and Sherlock Holmes. The events of the novel follow shortly after that of The Murder of Mary Russell.

The book was published by Bantam Books on June 12, 2018.  The audiobook published by Recorded Books is narrated by Jenny Sterlin.

References

Mary Russell (book series)
Sherlock Holmes pastiches
Fiction set in 1925
2018 American novels
Bantam Books books
Novels set in Venice